Protasius may refer to:

Protasius (martyr)
Protasius (bishop of Milan), reigned 328–343, saint
Protasius, an archbishop of Tarragona in 637–646, who assisted the Sixth (638) and Seventh (646) Councils of Toledo